The proverbial expression of  the mills of God grinding slowly refers to the notion of slow but certain divine retribution.

Ancient Greek usage 
Plutarch (1st century CE) alludes to the metaphor as a then-current adage in his Moralia (De sera numinis vindicta "On the Delay of Divine Vengeance"):
"Thus, I do not see what use there is in those mills of the gods said to grind so late as to render punishment hard to be recognized, and to make wickedness fearless."
Plutarch no doubt here makes reference to a hexameter by an unknown poet, cited by sceptic philosopher Sextus Empiricus (2nd century) in his Adversus Grammaticos as a popular adage: 
 
"The millstones of the gods grind late, but they grind fine."
The same expression was invoked by Celsus in his (lost) True Discourse.
Defending the concept of ancestral fault, Celsus reportedly quoted  "a priest of Apollo or of Zeus":

'The mills of the gods grind slowly', he says, even 'To children's children, and to those who are born after them.' 
The Sibylline Oracles (c. 175) have Sed mola postremo pinset divina farinam ("but the divine mill will at last grind the flour").

In 16th and 17th century Europe
The proverb was in frequent use in the Protestant Reformation, often in the Latin translation Sero molunt deorum molae due to Erasmus of Rotterdam (Adagia, 1500), but also in German translation.

The expression was anthologised in English translation by  George Herbert in his collection of proverbs entitled Jacula Prudentum (1652), as "God's mill grinds slow but sure" (no. 743).
German epigrammatist  Friedrich von Logau, in his Sinngedichte (c. 1654), composed an extended variant of the saying under the title "Göttliche Rache" (divine retribution), 
 
translated into English  by  Henry Wadsworth Longfellow ("Retribution", Poetic Aphorisms, 1846):
Though the mills of God grind slowly; Yet they grind exceeding small;
Though with patience He stands waiting, With exactness grinds He all.

Modern usage
Arthur Conan Doyle alluded to the proverb in his very first Sherlock Holmes adventure, A Study in Scarlet. The allusion is found in the fourth chapter of the second part, in a scene in which the character John Ferrier is confronted by two of the Mormon characters:
. . . Both of them nodded to Ferrier as he entered, and the one in the rocking-chair commenced the conversation.
“Maybe you don’t know us,” he said. “This here is the son of Elder Drebber, and I’m Joseph Stangerson, who travelled with you in the desert when the Lord stretched out His hand and gathered you into the true fold.”
“As He will all the nations in His own good time,” said the other in a nasal voice; “He grindeth slowly but exceeding small.”  John Ferrier bowed coldly. He had guessed who his visitors were. . . .

Arthur Conan Doyle, A Study in Scarlet (1886) (emphasis added).

The proverb was used by Agatha Christie in her novel Hercule Poirot's Christmas, as a person quoted it when they saw the corpse of a man who had lived an evil life. It was also referred to by W. Somerset Maugham in the novel The Moon and Sixpence wherein it is used, somewhat piously, by a family member to imply a certain justice in the demise of the central character Charles Strickland,

During the Second World War, both Winston Churchill and Franklin Roosevelt quoted Longfellow when promising retribution for the extermination of the Jews.

References

Further reading

See also

Ancestral fault
Justice delayed is justice denied

Greek proverbs
Justice
Revenge
Punishment
Theodicy
Quotations from religion